{{DISPLAYTITLE:Phi2 Orionis}}

Phi2 Orionis is a star in the constellation Orion, where it forms a small triangle on the celestial sphere with the nearby Meissa and Phi1 Orionis. This star is visible to the naked eye with an apparent visual magnitude of 4.081. Based upon an annual parallax shift of 27.76 mas, it is located around 117 light-years from the Sun.

This is a G-type giant or subgiant star with a stellar classification of G8 III-IV that, at the age of 6.9 billion years, is evolving away from the main sequence. It has 1.07 times the mass of the Sun, but has expanded to 7.72 times the Sun's radius.

References

G-type giants
Orionis, Phi
Orion (constellation)
Durchmusterung objects
Orionis, 40
037160
026366
1907
G-type subgiants